is a tram stop in Ukyo-ku, Kyoto, Japan, and the western terminus of the Randen Arashiyama Line that begins at . The station includes a small shopping arcade, outdoor eating areas, a foot bath, a garden featuring cherry and maple trees, as well as the "Kimono Forest," a collection of 600 kimono gowns wrapped around poles with LED lighting inside developed by the interior designer Yasumichi Morita.

History 

Arashiyama station opened on March 25, 1910, as the terminal station for the Arashiyama Railway connecting Arashiyama with Shijō-Ōmiya. The station was reconstructed in 1929 to accommodate the now-defunct Atagosan Railway. This line started at Arashiyama and headed westward towards Kiyotaki via the Kiyotaki Tunnel, where passengers would transfer to a narrow-gauge funicular to proceed their journey to the top of Mt. Atago. In 1944 the Atagosan Railway was abandoned, just two years after the Keifuku Electric Railroad seized operation of the Arashiyama Line.

In 2002 the "Arashiyama Hannari Hokkori Square" plaza was built, with the addition of the iconic foot bath in 2004. The station was completely renovated in 2007 and 2013.

Station layout 
The station consists of three platforms at ground level, with a wheelchair-accessible concourse and ticket barriers. Tracks 1 and 2 are primarily used.

Adjacent stations

Surrounding area 

 Tenryū-ji Temple
 Nonomiya Shrine
 Arashiyama Bamboo Grove 
 Kogenji Temple
 Kyoto Arashiyama Orgel Museum
 Hogonin Temple
 Iwatayama Monkey Park
 Okochi Sanzo Villa
 Saga-Torimoto
 Hozu River
 Togetsukyo Bridge
 Hankyu Arashiyama Station
 JR West Saga-Arashiyama Station
 Sagano Scenic Railway Torokko Saga Station

References

External links
 
 

Stations of Keifuku Electric Railroad
Railway stations in Japan opened in 1910